(Keep Jesus Christ in mind), 67, is a church cantata by Johann Sebastian Bach.

Based on the prescribed gospel of the appearance of Jesus to the Disciples, first without then with Thomas, an unknown poet compares the situation of the doubtful Thomas to the Christian in general. He places Nikolaus Herman's Easter hymn "" in the centre of the cantata, repeats the line "" (Peace be with you) several times, and ends with the first stanza from Jakob Ebert's hymn "" (Thou Prince of Peace, Lord Jesus Christ). Bach structured the work in seven movements, arranged in symmetry around the central chorale, and scored it for three solo voices, a four-part choir and a Baroque instrumental ensemble of a  slide horn for hymn tunes, flauto traverso, two oboes d'amore, strings and basso continuo. Besides the  unusual central chorale, the cantata contains a dramatic scena with Jesus repeating "Peace be with you" against the enemies.

History and words 
Bach composed the cantata in his first year as Thomaskantor in Leipzig, shortly after he first performed his St John Passion, for the First Sunday after Easter, called . The prescribed readings for that Sunday were from the First Epistle of John, "our faith is the victory", and from the Gospel of John, the appearance of Jesus to the Disciples, first without then with Thomas, in Jerusalem. The unknown poet begins with a verse from the Second Epistle to Timothy, "Remember that Jesus Christ … was raised from the dead". The poet sees Thomas as similar to the doubtful Christian in general, whose heart is not at peace. The center of the cantata is the Easter hymn "" (The glorious day has appeared) by Nikolaus Herman (1560), praising the day of the resurrection. In contrast, movement 5 recalls the danger by the enemies, until in movement 6 Jesus appears, as he did to his disciples in Jerusalem, finally bringing peace. The line "" (Peace be with you) is repeated four times, framing three stanzas of a poem. The closing chorale is the first stanza of "" (Thou Prince of Peace, Lord Jesus Christ) by Jakob Ebert (1601).

Bach led the first performance on 16 April 1724.

Music

Structure and scoring 
Bach structured the cantata in seven movements, arranged symmetrically around a central chorale. He scored the work for three vocal soloists (alto, tenor, bass), a four-part choir and a Baroque instrumental ensemble of corno da tirarsi (Ct, a slide horn that Bach scored for a short period), flauto traverso (Ft), two oboes d'amore (Oa), two violins (Vl), viola (Va), and basso continuo.

In the following table of the movements, the scoring follows the Neue Bach-Ausgabe. The keys and time signatures are taken from Alfred Dürr, using the symbol for common time (4/4). The continuo, playing throughout, is not shown.

Movements 

The opening chorus reflects the contrast of hope and resurrection versus simultaneous remembrance and doubt, which is present throughout the cantata. The chorus is structured in symmetry in seven sections, beginning with an instrumental sinfonia of all instruments, the horn introducing a theme representing remembrance in a melody which resembles the choral tune of "" which Bach would later use as a cantus firmus in the opening movement of his St Matthew Passion. Bach thus alludes to the idea that Jesus suffered innocently for the "sins of the world" before he rose again. In the second section, this melody is sung by the sopranos, while the lower voices stress the word "Halt" (hold) by several homophonic chords. In the third section, the sopranos repeat the melody in a fugue, while the altos simultaneously sing a countersubject that rises in fast movement for more than an octave, illustrating the resurrection. The fourth section is a reprise of the sinfonia with the voices added, then a variation of sections 2 to 4 follows as 5 to 7.

The tenor aria  (My Jesus is arisen) is accompanied by an obbligato oboe d'amore. The theme is presented in the opening by the strings and later picked up by the voice, illustrating the word "" by an upward run.

The Easter hymn "" marks the center of the composition. In symmetry, it is framed by two alto recitatives, the second a reprise of the first.

The idea of a solo singer alternating with a chorus is extended in the following movement, the bass aria with chorus  (Peace be with you). A string introduction depicts in agitated forte passages in 4/4 time the attack of the enemies. John Eliot Gardiner describes it as "a dramatic scena in which the strings work up a storm to illustrate the raging of the soul's enemies". In sharp contrast the bass as the vox Christi (voice of Christ) sings the greeting of Jesus from verse 19 of the Gospel, "Peace be with you", three times, accompanied by woodwinds in dotted rhythm in 3/4 time, marked piano. Musicologist Julian Mincham describes the music as serene, a "gentle, rocking, almost cradle-like rhythm creating a perfect atmosphere of peaceful contemplation". The upper voices of the choir (without basses) answer to the music of the introduction, seeing Jesus as help in the battle (""). The greeting and answering is repeated two more times in two stanzas of the poem, reflecting the strengthening of the weary in spirit and body (""), and finally overcoming death (""). The following fourth appearance of "Peace be with you" is accompanied by both woodwinds and strings, and peace is finally achieved. Klaus Hofmann describes the movement as an "operatic scene" and continues "Bach resorts to unconventional means; he shows himself as a musical dramatist and, in the process, stresses the element of contrast: he comments upon the words of the faithful with agitated, tumultuous string figures, whilst Jesus' peace greeting sounds calmly and majestically, embedded in pastoral wind sonorities." Bach adapted this movement as the Gloria of his Missa in A major, BWV 234.

The closing chorale "Du Friedefürst, Herr Jesu Christ" is a four-part setting.

Recordings 
The table below is taken from the selection on the Bach Cantatas Website. Performing groups singing one voice per part (OVPP) and instrumental groups playing period instruments in historically informed performances are marked by green background.

References

Sources 
 
 Halt im Gedächtnis Jesum Christ BWV 67; BC A 62 / Sacred cantata Bach Digital
 BWV 67 Halt im Gedächtnis Jesum Christ English translation, University of Vermont
 Luke Dahn: BWV 67.4, BWV 67.7 bach-chorales.com

External links 
 Halt im Gedächtnis Jesum Christ, BWV 67: performance by the Netherlands Bach Society (video and background information)

Church cantatas by Johann Sebastian Bach
1724 compositions